Bintanath (or Bentanath) was the firstborn daughter and later Great Royal Wife of the Egyptian Pharaoh Ramesses II.

Family

Bintanath was likely born during the reign of her grandfather Seti I. Her mother was Isetnofret, one of the two most prominent wives of Ramesses II. Her name is Semitic, meaning Daughter of Anath, referring to the Canaanite goddess Anath. She had at least three brothers, Ramesses, Khaemwaset and Merneptah and a sister who was named Isetnofret after their mother.

Bintanath had a daughter who appears on the paintings in her tomb in the Valley of the Queens. She is unnamed there but according to Joyce Tyldesley it is possible that her name was also Bintanath and she married the next pharaoh, Merneptah. According to Tyldesley, a statue of Merneptah in Luxor mentions "the Great Royal Wife Bintanath", who is, possibly, this daughter, since it is unlikely that the older Bintanath married Merneptah when both of them were well over sixty. However, it is entirely possible that Bintanath never married Merenptah and used the "Great Royal Wife" title only because she was entitled to it due to her first marriage.

Life

Bintanath is depicted in a scene on a pylon in Luxor dated to year 3 of Ramesses II. She is said to be the King's daughter of his body, and is the first in a procession of princesses. She is followed by Meritamen in this procession. Bintanath appears twice as a princess in Abu Simbel. Together with Nebettawy she flanks the southernmost colossus on the facade of the great temple. On one of the pillars inside the temple she is shown offering flowers to the goddess Anuqet.

Bentanath became Great Royal Wife around the 25th year of her father's reign. During her time as queen she held many titles including hereditary princess, the great first one (iryt-p`t-tpit-wrt), Lady of The Two Lands (nbt-t3wy), Great King’s Wife (hmt-niswt-wrt), Mistress of Upper and Lower Egypt (hnwt-Shm’w -mhw), King’s Daughter (s3t-niswt), and eventually King’s Sister (snt-niswt).

As (great) royal wife Bintanath appears on several statues of Pharaoh Ramesses II. She is depicted on a statue from the Sinai (BM 697), on two sandstone colossi found in Tanis, but probably originally from Pi-Ramesse, and on a statue from the south gate of the Ptah precinct in Memphis. An usurped Middle Kingdom statue from Heracleopolis depicts both Bintanath and her sister Meritamen, and a statue from Hermopolis depicts Bintanath and Henutmire (both as great royal wives). Bintanath is depicted on statues of her father at least three times in Karnak and Luxor, and she appears in statues in Wadi es-Sebua.

Two family stelae show Bintanath with her immediate family. The Aswan rock stela shows Ramesses II, Isetnofret and Khaemwaset before the god Khnum, while in another register Bintanath appears with her brothers Ramesses and Merneptah. Another stela from West Silsila depicts Bint-Anath standing behind her mother Isetnofret and her father Ramesses II as the king offers Maat to the gods Ptah and Nefertem. Prince Khaemwaset stands in front of the king, while her brothers Ramesses and Merneptah are shown in a lower register.

Death and burial
Despite her being Ramesses' first daughter, she was actually one of the few children who outlived their long-lived father. She was depicted on a statue usurped by Merenptah. She died during the reign of her brother Merneptah and was buried in the tomb QV71 in the Valley of the Queens.

The tomb is described by Lepsius (number 4). The name of Bintanath is given in slightly different spellings in the tomb. Bintanath is shown before Osiris and Nephtys. Both gods say: "I grant you a place of repose in the land of righteousness." Queen Bintanath is depicted with her daughter, who is not named. Bintanath's sarcophagus was later usurped by a man.

See also
 List of children of Ramesses II

Sources

External links
 Anneke Bart: Queen Bint-Anath

Queens consort of the Nineteenth Dynasty of Egypt
13th-century BC Egyptian women
Children of Ramesses II
Wives of Ramesses II
Anat